The Tomb of Ahmad Shah Durrani is located in Kandahar, Afghanistan. It is the most important historical monument in Kandahar. Ahmad Shah Durrani, fondly known as Ahmad Shah Baba, Father of Afghanistan, ruled an empire from Kandahar from 1747-1772.

The graceful octagonal monument stands on a basaltic platform, the plain beige brick exterior decorated with numerous niches of contrasting heights and depths, delicately outlined with yellow and green, green and blue, tile. Tall minarets connected by a floral balustrade top the main body of the monument and behind them yet another set of short minarets atop a series of shallow niches outlined in blue, surround a drum crowned with a dome of glistening blue tile. The soffits of the main arches are cleverly decorated in a honeycomb pattern composed of half circles centered with lapis lazuli and gold to resemble flowers.

The exterior decoration seems very spartan once one enters. Here the eye is delighted with a sumptuous richness of color and design from the gorgeous Afghan carpets on the marble floor to the brilliantly painted and gilded floral decoration of the dome. The blue-green tile with touches of yellow and brown around the base of the walls is made in Kandahar and is quite distinctive from the tilework of Herat.

On the eight cornices under the corner niches a large inscription in white on lapis blue tile extolls the virtues of Emperor Ahmad Shah Durrani:

The sarcophagus is made of Kandahari marble and covered with a gold-embroidered cloth of deep wine velvet. Beside this there is a table holding fine copies of the Quran and a glass cabinet containing a gold-inlaid helmet and gauntlets together with a sceptre inlaid in silver and embellished with a two-headed bird. It is with these that Ahmad Shah Durrani went forth to battle.

Within the compound is also the Friday Mosque with the Shrine of the Cloak, which is believed to be worn by the Islamic prophet Muhammad. It has switched hands until finally resting here.

See also 
 Tomb of Timur Shah Durrani

References

External links 

 old image of the tomb

Buildings and structures in Kandahar
Burial sites of the Durrani dynasty